Eric King (born May 10, 1982 in Baltimore, Maryland) is a former American football cornerback. He was drafted by the Buffalo Bills in the fifth round of the 2005 NFL Draft. He played college football at Wake Forest. King has also played for the Tennessee Titans, Cleveland Browns and Detroit Lions.

Early years
King attended McDonogh School in Owings Mills, Maryland, and was a three-sport letterman in football, basketball, and track. In football, he won first-team All-State honors, a first-team All-Metro honors, first-team All-County honors, and helped lead his team to four conference championships.  As a senior, he had over 1,200 all-purpose yards on offense, and on defense, he added 5 interceptions, and 45 tackles.  In basketball, he helped lead his team to three conference championships.  In track, he was the private school champion in both the 100 meter dash and the long jump.  Father, Eric King, Sr. played basketball for the NAIA national champions Coppin State Eagles in the mid 1970s and professionally in Venezuela.

He spent a postgrad year at The Hill School

Professional career
King signed with the Cleveland Browns on November 16, 2010. He was cut by the Browns and picked up off waivers by the Detroit Lions on December 16, 2010. King was released by the Detroit Lions on February 10, 2011.

References

External links
Wake Forest Demon Deacons bio
Detroit Lions bio
Agent: Lions release DB Eric King

1982 births
Living people
American football cornerbacks
Wake Forest Demon Deacons football players
Buffalo Bills players
Tennessee Titans players
Detroit Lions players
People from Owings Mills, Maryland
Players of American football from Baltimore
The Hill School alumni